The Painted Grey Ware culture (PGW) is an Iron Age Indo-Aryan culture of the western Gangetic plain and the Ghaggar-Hakra valley in the Indian subcontinent, conventionally dated 1200 to 600–500 BCE, or from 1300 to 500–300 BCE It is a successor of the Cemetery H culture and Black and red ware culture (BRW) within this region, and contemporary with the continuation of the BRW culture in the eastern Gangetic plain and Central India.

Characterized by a style of fine, grey pottery painted with geometric patterns in black, the PGW culture is associated with village and town settlements, domesticated horses, ivory-working, and the advent of iron metallurgy. , 1,576 PGW sites have been discovered. Although most PGW sites were small farming villages, "several dozen" PGW sites emerged as relatively large settlements that can be characterized as towns; the largest of these were fortified by ditches or moats and embankments made of piled earth with wooden palisades, albeit smaller and simpler than the elaborate fortifications which emerged in large cities after 600 BCE.

The PGW Culture probably corresponds to the middle and late Vedic period, i.e., the Kuru-Panchala kingdom, the first large state in the Indian subcontinent after the decline of the Indus Valley civilisation. The later vedic literature provides a mass of information on the life and culture of the times. It is succeeded by Northern Black Polished Ware from c.700–500 BCE, associated with the rise of the great Mahajanapada states and of the Magadha Empire.

Dating 
The Painted Grey Ware culture (PGW) is conventionally dated 1500 to 500 BCE.

Akinori Uesugi regards PGW as having three periods within North Indian Iron Age which are:
Period I (c. 1300–1000 BCE)
When it makes its appearance in the Ghaggar valley and the upper Ganga region.
Period II (c. 1000–600 BCE)
When it spreads into the western part of the Ganga valley.
Period III (c. 600–300 BCE)
With interactions to the east.

Recent Archaeology 
Two periods of PGW were identified recently at Ahichhatra by archaeologist Bhuvan Vikrama and his group, the earliest from c. 1500 to 800 BCE, and the late from 800 to 400 BCE.

Overview

The PGW culture cultivated rice, wheat, millet and barley, and domesticated cattle, sheep, pigs, and horses. Houses were built of wattle-and-daub, mud, or bricks, ranging in size from small huts to large houses with many rooms. There is a clear settlement hierarchy, with a few central towns that stand out amongst numerous small villages. Some sites, including Jakhera in Uttar Pradesh, demonstrate a “fairly evolved, proto-urban or semi-urban stage” of this culture, with evidence of social organization and trade, including ornaments of gold, copper, ivory, and semi-precious stones, storage bins for surplus grain, stone weights, paved streets, water channels and embankments.

The plough was used for cultivation. There are also indications of growing complexity of society as population increased and the size and number of settlements multiplied. Arts and crafts of the PGW people are represented by ornaments (made from terracotta, stone, faience, and glass), human and animal figurines (made from terracotta) as well as "incised terracotta discs with decorated edges and geometric motifs" which probably had "ritual meaning," perhaps representing symbols of deities. There are a few stamp seals with geometric designs but no inscription, contrasting with both the prior Harappan seals and the subsequent Brahmi-inscribed seals of the Northern Black Polished Ware culture.

The PGW pottery shows a remarkable degree of standardization. It is dominated by bowls of two shapes, a shallow tray and a deeper bowl, often with a sharp angle between the walls and base. The range of decoration is limited - vertical, oblique or criss-cross lines, rows of dots, spiral chains and concentric circles being common.

At Bhagwanpura in the Kurukshetra district of Haryana, excavations have revealed an overlap between the late Harappan and Painted Grey Ware cultures, large houses that may have been elite residences, and fired bricks that may have been used in Vedic altars.

Fresh surveys by archaeologist Vinay Kumar Gupta suggest Mathura was the largest PGW site around 375 hectares in area. Among the largest sites is also the recently excavated Ahichatra, with at least 40 hectares of area in PGW times along with evidence of early construction of the fortification which goes back to PGW levels. Towards the end of the period, many of the PGW settlements grew into the large towns and cities of the Northern Black Polished Ware period.

Interpretations
The pottery style of this culture is different from the pottery of the Iranian Plateau and Afghanistan (Bryant 2001). In some sites, PGW pottery and Late Harappan pottery are contemporaneous. The archaeologist Jim Shaffer (1984:84-85) has noted that "at present, the archaeological record indicates no cultural discontinuities separating Painted Grey Ware from the indigenous protohistoric culture." However, the continuity of pottery styles may be explained by the fact that pottery was generally made by indigenous craftsmen even after the Indo-Aryan migration. According to Chakrabarti (1968) and other scholars, the origins of the subsistence patterns (e.g. rice use) and most other characteristics of the Painted Grey Ware culture are in eastern India or even Southeast Asia.

Recent research
In 2013, the University of Cambridge and Banaras Hindu University excavated at Alamgirpur near Delhi, where they found a period overlap between the later part of the Harappan phase (with a "noticeable slow decline in quality") and the earliest PGW levels; Sample OxA-21882 showed a calibrated radiocarbon dating from 2136 BCE to 1948 BCE, but seven other samples from the overlap phase that were submitted for dating failed to give a result. A team of the Archaeological Survey of India led by B.R. Mani and Vinay Kumar Gupta collected charcoal samples from Gosna, a site 6 km east of Mathura across the Yamuna river, where two of the radiocarbon dates from the PGW deposit came out to be 2160 BCE and 2170 BCE, but they mention that "there is a possibility that the cultural horizon which is now regarded as belonging to the P.G.W. period might turn out to be as belonging to a period with only plain grey ware." However, later on, other two datings confirming early PGW horizon in Kampil excavations were published as 2310 +/- 120 BCE and 1360 +/- 90 BCE by archaeologist D.P. Tewari.

Excavation at Anuradhapura in Sri Lanka has unearthed PGW pottery from the 'Basal early historic' period of Anuradhapura (600 BC-500 BCE) showing connections with North India.

See also
Kuru Kingdom
Panchala
Mahajanapadas

Notes

References

Further reading

Chakrabarti, D.K. 1968. The Aryan hypothesis in Indian archaeology. Indian Studies Past and Present 4, 333–358.
Jim Shaffer. 1984. The Indo-Aryan Invasions: Cultural Myth and Archaeological Reality. In: J.R. Lukak. The People of South Asia. New York: Plenum. 1984.
Kennedy, Kenneth 1995. "Have Aryans been identified in the prehistoric skeletal record from South Asia?", in George Erdosy, ed.: The Indo-Aryans of Ancient South Asia, p. 49–54.

External links

Indus Valley Civilization

Iron Age cultures of South Asia
Prehistoric Pakistan
Prehistoric India
Iron Age cultures of Asia
13th-century BC establishments in India
6th-century BC disestablishments in India
Archaeological cultures in India
Indo-Aryan archaeological cultures